Caroline Lyra Celico (born July 26, 1987) is a Brazilian socialite, singer and former Evangelical pastor at the Reborn in Christ Church, which she left in 2010. Celico was married to football player Kaká from 2005 to 2015.

Personal life 
Celico was born to Rosangela Lyra and Celso Celico in São Paulo, Brazil, in 1987. She has one younger brother, Enrico. Her parents divorced when she was six-years-old. Celico lived most of her childhood with her mother, who was the director of designers at Christian Dior S.A. She has stated she was bullied in her childhood. Celico attended St. Paul's School in São Paulo.

In 2002, while still in school, she met Kaká. They were in a relationship for two years during which Kaká was mostly away to play for A.C. Milan. During that time, Celico joined Kaká's church and later became a pastor. During a vacation to Milan, Kaká proposed to her and the couple were married on December 23, 2005, in São Paulo. Together they have two children: son Luca Celico Leite (born June 10, 2008) and daughter Isabella Celico Leite (born April 23, 2011). The couple resided in Madrid with their children while Kaká played at Real Madrid. In 2013, they moved back to Milan, Italy. The couple announced their divorce on social media in 2015.

She got engaged in 2020 to her longtime boyfriend Eduardo Scarpa Julião. They got married in 25 September 2021 in São Paulo.

Professional life 

Celico has created a non-profit organization called Horizontal Love, which provides supplies for food, hygiene, construction and education to Brazilian NGOs.

Discography
 Carol Celico (2010)

References

External links
 Official website

1987 births
Living people
People from São Paulo
Brazilian socialites
Brazilian evangelicals
Association footballers' wives and girlfriends